Sebastian Iwanow (born 29 June 1985) is a German paraswimmer and Paralympic medal winner.

Biography 
Iwanow was born in 1985 in Bergisch Gladbach. He competes in the S6, SM6 and SB6 classifications.

References

External links
 

German male backstroke swimmers
German male butterfly swimmers
German male freestyle swimmers
German male medley swimmers
Paralympic silver medalists for Germany
Medalists at the 2012 Summer Paralympics
German disabled sportspeople
People from Bergisch Gladbach
Sportspeople from Cologne (region)
1985 births
Living people
Swimmers at the 2004 Summer Paralympics
Swimmers at the 2008 Summer Paralympics
Swimmers at the 2012 Summer Paralympics
Paralympic medalists in swimming
S6-classified Paralympic swimmers
Paralympic bronze medalists for Germany
Medalists at the World Para Swimming Championships
Medalists at the World Para Swimming European Championships
Paralympic swimmers of Germany